Henry Houghton may refer to:

Henry Oscar Houghton (1823–1893), American publisher and mayor
Henry Houghton (Royal Navy officer) (died 1703)

See also
Harry Houghton (1905–1985), spy for Poland and the USSR